The Brothers García is an American television series that originally aired from July 23, 2000 to August 8, 2004 on Nickelodeon. There were a total 52 episodes over the course of 4 seasons.

Series overview

Episodes

Season 1 (2000)

Season 2 (2001)

Season 3 (2002)

Season 4 (2003–04)

External links
 

Brothers Garcia